Zachary Sami P. Lichman, commonly known as Ziggy and also Zac or Zach (born 5 January 1981 in Camden, London) is a former member of the boy band Northern Line (1998–2000) and reality TV contestant, having appeared in the 8th series of the UK edition of Big Brother'.

Education
Lichman was educated at two senior independent schools: at University College School in Hampstead in north west London, and Aldenham School, In Elstree in Hertfordshire.

Life and career
Lichman has appeared as a contestant on television shows such as Five Go Dating on E4 and the 2007 edition of Big Brother'' in the United Kingdom.

References

External links
 

1971 births
Living people
Big Brother (British TV series) contestants
People from Camden Town
People educated at Haberdashers' Boys' School
People educated at University College School
English Jews